The Big South Conference Men's Basketball Player of the Year is an annual college basketball award given to the Big South Conference's most outstanding player. The award was first given following the 1985–86 season, the first year the league conducted basketball competition.

The most notable recipient of the Big South Player of the Year Award is Tony Dunkin. Dunkin, a 6'7" (2.01 m) small forward, played for the Coastal Carolina Chanticleers from 1989 to 1993 and won the award all four seasons. He is the only NCAA Division I men's basketball player to ever earn four conference player of the year awards.

Coastal Carolina, which left the Big South for the Sun Belt Conference after the 2015–16 season, has the most all-time awards with nine and individual winners with five. Among current members, Winthrop has the most awards with six. The only established Big South members without any winners are three of the six newest members of the conference—Presbyterian (joining in 2007), Gardner–Webb (2008), and Longwood (2012). Although Campbell's current tenure in the Big South dates only to 2011, it has three winners from its first conference tenure (1983–1994).

Key

Winners

Winners by school

Footnotes

References
General

Specific

NCAA Division I men's basketball conference players of the year
Player
Awards established in 1986
1986 establishments in the United States